Maria Heep-Altiner (born 29 December 1959 in Niederzeuzheim) is a German mathematician, actuary and university lecturer.

Life 
After graduating from the Prince Johann Ludwig School  in Hadamar in 1978, Heep-Altiner studied mathematics and economics at the University of Bonn. In 1989 she earned her doctorate in mathematics on the Number theory topic "Period relations for " under Günter Harder and Michael Rapoport.

She then worked as an actuary for Gerling,  before she moved companies in 1994 to Allgemeine Versicherungs-AG. There she became the actuarial manager for property insurance. In 2006, she moved to Talanx, where she was responsible for setting up an internal holding model.

In 2008, Heep-Altiner returned to academia as a professor at the Institute of Insurance at Cologne university of applied sciences. There she is responsible for the area of financing in the insurance company.

She is a member of the German Actuarial Society executive board.

In addition, she has co-published various publications on various actuarial topics, in particular on the Solvency II Directive 2009.

Publications 

For the following books Heep-Altiner was the main author or significant part of the writing team:

References 

1959 births
Living people
20th-century German mathematicians
21st-century German mathematicians
Actuaries
Number theory
Academic staff of the University of Bonn
Women mathematicians